Andrew Sibley Everest (October 27, 1924 – December 21, 2014) was an American football player and coach and college athletics administrator. He served as the head football coach at UC Santa Barbara from 1970 to 1971, compiling a record of 5–17. Everest was the athletic director at North Texas State University—now known as the University of North Texas—from 1979 to 1981.

Everest twice served as an assistant to coach Hayden Fry, first at SMU and later at North Texas State.

Head coaching record

College

References

1924 births
2014 deaths
American football centers
American football linebackers
New Orleans Saints coaches
North Texas Mean Green athletic directors
North Texas Mean Green football coaches
SMU Mustangs football coaches
Stanford Cardinal football coaches
UC Santa Barbara Gauchos football coaches
Utah Utes football coaches
UTEP Miners football players
High school football coaches in Texas
People from Wichita Falls, Texas
Players of American football from Texas